Elgiva is a genus of marsh flies in the family Sciomyzidae. There are about eight described species in Elgiva.

Species
E. connexa (Steyskal, 1954)
E. cucularia (Linnaeus, 1767)
E. divisa (Loew, 1845)
E. elegans Orth & Knutson, 1987
E. manchurica Rozkosny & Knutson, 1991
E. pacnowesa Orth & Knutson, 1987
E. rufina (Hendel, 1931)
E. solicita (Harris, 1780)

References

Further reading

External links

 

Sciomyzidae
Sciomyzoidea genera